Azinhoso is a Portuguese freguesia ("civil parish") in the Concelho of Mogadouro. The population in 2011 was 307, in an area of 30.80 km². It was parish and capital of Concelho between 1386 and the beginning of the 19th century. In 1801 it had 302 inhabitants.

References

Freguesias of Mogadouro